Kamal Uddin Siddiqui, is a Bangladeshi economist and social scientist. He is faculty member of Monash University,

In 1971, he participated in the Liberation War of Bangladesh. A career civil servant, he served as the principal secretary to the Prime Minister Khaleda Zia until 2006. He was nominated by Bangladesh for election to the United Nations Committee on the Rights of the Child, and served from 2005 to 2009. He was until 2006 chief editor of the Encyclopedia of Flora and Fauna of Bangladesh, the first volumes of which were published in 2008 by Asiatic Society of Bangladesh.

Participation in War of Liberation
Bangladesh's war of liberation commenced on 25 March 1971. At that time, Siddiqui was serving as the Sub-Divisional Officer (SDO) of Norail. He quit his job and walked to India to participate in the war against the Pakistani army. After the establishment of Bangladesh on 16 December 1971, he returned home and was appointed as the Deputy Commissioner (DC) and District Magistrate of the Khulna District.

Research

Latest work
While teaching at Monash University, Siddiqui co-authored a book on diplomacy which was published in 2009.

Cocktail ideology and poverty
Recently he completed a project on "Deadly Sins of Cocktail Ideology and the Vicious Cycle of Poverty in Developing Countries". The objective of the research was to delineate the processes which cause, maintain, aggravate and reduce poverty in a typical village in Bangladesh, based on field work. The project evaluates the impact of economic and non-economic factors on poverty and establishes the role of ideology and beliefs in the whole process.

Siddiqui coined the term "cocktail ideology" to characterise the cultural profile of the Bangladeshi people in the 21st century. A "cocktail ideology", combining the retrogressive interpretation of religion and tradition with vulgar elements of the so-called modernity, has emerged in many developing countries since the 1960s and the population of Bangladesh, among other developing courtiers, reflects uneasy and tense co-existence of these two components. Women and middle-aged men are, in general, the bearers of tradition and religious orthodoxy, while the younger generation tends to carry the flag for "decadent modernity". It has been found that the poor tend to be more affected by this "cocktail ideology" than any other class of society.

MegaCity governance
The term megalopolis was first used in 1940 by Lewis Mumford to refer to the great mega cities growing uncontrollably. Manuel Castells called the emergence of such mega cities of eight illion or more people a feature of 21st century urbanisation. Kamal Siddiqui, in association with Archana Ghosh, Sharit K. Bhowmik, Shahid A Siddiqi, Madhulika Mitra, Shchi Kapuria, Nilay Ranjan and Jamshed Ahmed researched the growth of mega cities in South Asia, namely Mumbai, Delhi, Dhaka, Kolkata and Karachi which will have in 2015 a population of 23 million, 21 million, 18 million, 17 million and 16 million respectively.

Kamal Siddiqui and his team identified the characteristics of these mega cities, marked with corruption, poor accountability, lack of transparency and perverse prioritisation.

Work for children's rights
Siddiqui acted as Chairman of the Inter-Ministerial Standing Committee on Child Rights of the government of Bangladesh from January 2002. On 12 March 2003 he organised an International Workshop on Child Labour in Dhaka under the auspices of Asian Cooperation Dialogue (ACD). In September 2003 he led the Bangladesh delegation to the meeting of the Committee on the Rights of the Child in Geneva to review the second periodic report on the implementation of the Convention on the Rights of the Child in Bangladesh.

Since March 2004, he acted as the Chairman of the National Committee to suggest the organizational set-up of the office of Independent Children Commissioner for Bangladesh. He led a Bangladesh Government delegation to France, Norway and Sweden in February 2004 to study the Children Ombudsman institution in these countries with a view to setting up such an institution in Bangladesh.

Since February 2005 he has been serving as the Chairperson of the Committee on the Rights of the Child of United Nations High Commission for Human Rights. His achievements during the last three years include the release of a large number of children from jails, establishment of nurseries in prisons and safe homes, raising the age of criminal liability and converting correction centres for children into development centres. Recognized as a champion of children by the High Court Division of the Supreme Court of Bangladesh in its landmark judgement in a child rights case in 2003, owing to these activities.

Social formation in Dhaka City 
This is a study which takes stock of the social formation of Dhaka city as it has evolved in the latter half of the 20th century. Kamal Siddiqui has carried out this research in association with Sayeda Rowshan Qadir, Sitara Alamgir and Sayeedul Huq. While the book sets out with a focus on the historical background of Dhaka, its objective is to prepare an account of social structure of Dhaka, first as the provincial capital of the then East Pakistan and of Bangladesh since latter's emergence in 1971. As it has been observed, "the growth of Dhaka city has been predominantly the result of net migration, which accounted for 62.9 per cent of population growth between 1961 and 1974 and 70.5 percent between 1974 and 1981 ..., about 60 percent of Dhaka's population growth between 1981 and 2000 is anticipated to be the result of net migration ... The push factors in connection with migration include over-population, floods and natural disasters, erosion, growing landlessness and exploitation, by the rural elites and money lenders. The pull factors are employment opportunities in the informal sector, relief activities and the statutory ration system in Dhaka city under which, until recently, foodstuffs were sold at substantially subsidised prices." (p. 16). As many as ten thousand households of the city have been investigated to deduce the true class of different classes of people. In addition, special account was taken of certain selected groups, namely, the residents of Dhaka government colonies, the "richest people" of Dhaka city, the beggars, prostitutes and criminals.

Local government in Bangladesh
The revised third edition of the book was published in 2005. The book covers urban and rural local government systems of Bangladesh. It focuses on the initiation, evolution, structure and composition, functions, finance, national-local relations, personnel management and major issues and problems of local government system of the country. The introductory chapter of the book undertakes a theoretical treatment of local government while the concluding chapter offers a summary of the major trends in Bangladesh's local government system.

Publications
 Kamal Siddiqui (Editor in Chief)  Encyclopaedia of Flora and Fauna of Bangladesh:  2008; Asiatic Society, Dhaka.
  Megacity Governance in South Asia : A Comparative Study, 2004, University Press Ltd., Dhaka.
 Better days, better lives: Towards a strategy for implementing the convention on the rights of the child in Bangladesh, 2001, University Press Ltd., Dhaka.
 Local governance in Bangladesh: Leading issues and major challenges, 2000, University Press Ltd., Dhaka.(The third edition of the book was published in 2005).
 Jagatpur, 1977–97: Poverty and social change in rural Bangladesh, 2000, University Press Ltd., Dhaka.
 Land Management in South Asia: A Comparative Study, 1997, Dhaka.
 Fiscal decentralisation in Bangladesh, 1991, National Institute of Local Government, Dhaka.
 An evaluation of the Grameen Bank operation, 1984, Dhaka.
 Towards good governance in Bangladesh: Fifty unpleasant Essays, 1996, Dhaka.
 Local Government in Bangladesh, 1994, Dhaka.
 Social Formation in Dhaka City, 1993, University Press Ltd., Dhaka.
 Implementation of land reform in four villages of Bangladesh (APDAC's policies and implementation of land reform series), 1980, Dhaka.
 The political economy of land reforms in Bangladesh, 1979, Dhaka.
 Bāṃlādeśe bhūmi-saṃskārera rājanaitika arthanīti, 1981, Bāṃlādeśa Unnaẏana Gabeshaṇā Saṃsthā, Dhaka.

References

External links
 Office of the High Commissioner for Human Rights
 A review by  Archana Ghosh of Mega City Governance in South Asia
 
 The Social Investment Program Project : Welcome Message

1945 births
Living people
Bangladeshi economists
Bangladeshi male writers
Bangladeshi civil servants
Bangladeshi sociologists
Bengali-language writers
Bangladeshi revolutionaries
People from Comilla District
University of Dhaka alumni
Bangladesh Liberation War
Children's rights in Bangladesh